Canidia ochreostictica is a species of longhorn beetles of the subfamily Lamiinae. It was described by Dillon in 1956, and is known from western central Mexico.

References

Beetles described in 1956
Acanthocinini